Hickman County is a county located in the U.S. state of Kentucky. As of the 2020 census, the population was 4,521, making it the third-least populous county in Kentucky. Its county seat is Clinton.  The county was formed in 1821. It is the least densely populated county in the state and is a prohibition or dry county.

History 

Founded in 1821, Hickman County was the seventy-first in order of formation. It was named for Captain Paschal Hickman of the 1st Rifle Regiment, Kentucky Militia.  A resident of Franklin County, Kentucky, Hickman was wounded and captured at the Battle of Frenchtown in January 1813 and was killed by Indians in the Massacre of the River Raisin.

Columbus, Kentucky, in the northwest of the county and located on the Mississippi River, was the original county seat. A log structure built in 1823 served as the courthouse. In 1830, the county seat was moved to the more centrally located Clinton.

In 1861, early in the American Civil War, the Confederate Army established Fort de Russey on the strategically located bluffs at Columbus across the river from Belmont, Missouri. Confederate General Leonidas Polk knew it was important to control the river, and wanted to extend a massive chain across the Mississippi to block Union forces from going downstream. (This was never achieved.) The fort was garrisoned with several thousand troops and a six-gun battery was installed; a smaller force was based at a Confederate camp in Belmont.

Union Gen. Ulysses S. Grant moved troops from his base at Cairo, Illinois, and attacked Belmont in November 1861, his first battle of the war. He was ultimately defeated by Confederate troops sent from Columbus across the river to reinforce the Confederate defense; they were led by Polk. The former site of the Confederate fortifications near Columbus, Kentucky is now the Columbus-Belmont State Park, commemorating all the actions of the day that led to Union defeat here.

Geography

The county's western border is formed by the Mississippi River, nearly a mile wide here, with the state of Missouri on the other side. Some portions of the county are landlocked to Missouri west of the Mississippi.

Adjacent counties
 Carlisle County  (north)
 Graves County  (east)
 Weakley County, Tennessee  (southeast)
 Obion County, Tennessee  (south)
 Fulton County  (south)
 Mississippi County, Missouri  (west)

Demographics 

As of the census of 2000, there were 5,262 people, 2,188 households, and 1,542 families residing in the county. The racial makeup of the county was 88.35% White, 9.90% Black or African American, 0.29% Native American, 0.06% Asian, 0.17% from other races, and 1.24% from two or more races. 1.03% of the population were Hispanic or Latino of any race.

There were 2,188 households, out of which 28.20% had children under the age of 18 living with them, 56.50% were married couples living together, 10.80% had a female householder with no husband present, and 29.50% were non-families. 27.60% of all households were made up of individuals, and 13.00% had someone living alone who was 65 years of age or older. The average household size was 2.34 and the average family size was 2.82.

In the county, the population was spread out, with 22.10% under the age of 18, 6.90% from 18 to 24, 26.70% from 25 to 44, 25.90% from 45 to 64, and 18.50% who were 65 years of age or older. The median age was 41 years. For every 100 females there were 91.30 males. For every 100 females age 18 and over, there were 88.90 males.

The median income for a household in the county was $31,615, and the median income for a family was $37,049. Males had a median income of $28,438 versus $18,506 for females. The per capita income for the county was $17,279. About 14.20% of families and 17.40% of the population were below the poverty line, including 27.70% of those under age 18 and 13.80% of those age 65 or over.

Communities

Cities
 Clinton (county seat)
 Columbus

Unincorporated communities
 Bugg
 Hailwell
 Moscow
 New Cypress
 Oakton

Notable people
 Robert Burns Smith, third Governor of Montana

Politics

See also

 Murphy's Pond
 Dry counties
 National Register of Historic Places listings in Hickman County, Kentucky

References

 
Kentucky counties
Kentucky counties on the Mississippi River
1821 establishments in Kentucky
Populated places established in 1821